Bilitis is a 1977 French romantic and erotic drama film, directed by photographer David Hamilton, with a music score by Francis Lai. It stars Patti D'Arbanville and Mona Kristensen as the title character Bilitis and Melissa, respectively.

The film is loosely based on a poem cycle by Pierre Louÿs entitled The Songs of Bilitis set in ancient Greece, although the film is set in modern Europe. The poems were meant to be autobiographical works by the title character.

Synopsis
A teenage schoolgirl spends the summer with a couple whose marriage is strained, and develops a lesbian crush on the wife. Meanwhile, she pursues a local teenage boy and tries to find a "suitable male lover" for the wife.
 
Although Bilitis can be described as a coming of age film the title character, Bilitis, ends up returning to school at the end of the film, realizing that she is not yet ready for adulthood.

Cast
 Patti D'Arbanville as Bilitis
 Mona Kristensen as Melissa
 Bernard Giraudeau as Lucas
 Gilles Kohler as Pierre
 Mathieu Carrière as Nikias
 Irka Bochenko as Prudence
 Jacqueline Fontaine as Head Mistress
 Marie-Thérèse Caumont as Sub-Principal
 Germaine Delbat as Principal
 Madeleine Damien as Nanny
 Camille Larivière as Susy
 Catherine Leprince as Helen
 Sabine Froute as Sabine

Production
The film was shot in the same soft focus style that was characteristic of David Hamilton's photography and his other films.

Companion book
In 1977, Hamilton released a photobook, Bilitis, which included the most memorable images from the film.

Soundtrack charts

References

External links
 
 

1977 films
1970s erotic drama films
1977 romantic drama films
1977 LGBT-related films
1970s French-language films
Films directed by David Hamilton
French LGBT-related films
Lesbian-related films
French romantic drama films
French erotic drama films
Films scored by Francis Lai
Erotic romance films
Teensploitation
Films based on works by Pierre Louÿs
1970s French films